Daisy Jazz Isobel Ridley (born 10 April 1992) is an English actress. She rose to prominence for her role as Rey in the Star Wars sequel trilogy: The Force Awakens (2015), The Last Jedi (2017), and The Rise of Skywalker (2019).

She also appeared in the mystery film Murder on the Orient Express (2017), played the title character of the romantic drama Ophelia (2018), and has done occasional voice acting, such as the live-action/animated film Peter Rabbit (2018) and video games including Twelve Minutes.

Early life
Daisy Jazz Isobel Ridley was born on 10 April 1992 in the London borough of Westminster, and grew up in Maida Vale. She is the youngest of three daughters born to Christopher Ridley, a photographer, and Louise (née Fawkner-Corbett), who works in internal communications for a bank. She has two older sisters, Kika Rose and Poppy Sophia, as well as two older half-sisters. Her mother's family, the Fawkner-Corbetts, were landed gentry with a military and medical background. Her paternal great-uncle, Arnold Ridley served in the military as well. He separately forged a career as a playwright and actor (and is best remembered for playing Private Godfrey in the sitcom Dad's Army). Arnold Ridley's brother, Daisy's grandfather, John Harry Dunn Ridley, OBE, was head of the Engineering Secretariat at the BBC from 1950 to 1965.

Ridley has stated that while growing up, her favourite film was Matilda (1996), referring to the titular character (played by Mara Wilson) as a role model. While not a particularly strong Star Wars fan as a youth, she dedicatedly followed the Harry Potter series.

Ridley won a scholarship to Tring Park School for the Performing Arts in Hertfordshire, which she attended from ages nine to eighteen. She then studied classical civilisation at Birkbeck, University of London, before dropping out to focus on her acting career. Prior to being cast in Star Wars: The Force Awakens, Ridley worked for nearly two years as a bartender at two different pubs in London. In 2016, she began studying for a Bachelor of Arts in social science through online courses with the Open University.

Career

2013–2015: Beginnings and Star Wars breakthrough 
Ridley began her career with minor roles in the television programmes Youngers, Toast of London, Silent Witness, Mr Selfridge, and Casualty. She appeared in the short film Blue Season, which was entered into the Sci-Fi-London 48-Hour Film Challenge. Ridley played the lead in film three of Lifesaver, an interactive film which was nominated for a BAFTA Award. She also appeared in the music video for Wiley's song "Lights On", playing the character of Kim. Ridley made her film debut in the 2015 British independent horror film Scrawl, after her scenes from the British comedy film The Inbetweeners 2 were removed in the final cut.

In April 2014, the casting of Ridley as Rey, one of the lead characters in The Force Awakens, was announced. She was cast for the film in February 2014. At the time of her casting she was, according to Rolling Stone, a "total unknown." Her choice by director J. J. Abrams was seen as a repeat of George Lucas' move of casting relatively unknown actors for the lead roles in the first Star Wars film in 1977.

Ridley began filming her scenes in May 2014 at Pinewood Studios in Buckinghamshire, and prior to the film's release in December 2015, she appeared at the launch of a set of Star Wars postage stamps issued by the UK postal service Royal Mail, with her character Rey featuring on a stamp along with the droid BB-8. With international revenues of over $2 billion, The Force Awakens was a major box-office hit and the highest-grossing film of 2015. Her performance received critical acclaim, with Richard Roeper describing her portrayal as "a breakout performance" and adding "[Harrison] Ford has a terrific father figure chemistry [shared] with Ridley and [John] Boyega".

2016–present: Continuing career 
Ridley became the executive producer of the documentary The Eagle Huntress in January 2016, which premiered at the Sundance Film Festival on 24 January 2016; she also recorded narration for the film's wide release. Ridley was one of several actors featured on Barbra Streisand's 2016 album Encore: Movie Partners Sing Broadway. Along with Anne Hathaway, Ridley and Streisand perform the song "At the Ballet" from A Chorus Line, with Ridley performing the role of Bebe, one of a trio of dancers hoping to be cast in a forthcoming show.

In 2017, Ridley portrayed Mary Debenham in Murder on the Orient Express, an adaptation of Agatha Christie's detective novel of the same name. Directed by and starring Kenneth Branagh, production began in London in November 2016. She also reprised her role as Rey, opposite Mark Hamill as Luke Skywalker, in Star Wars: The Last Jedi, which was released in December 2017.

In January 2018, Ridley starred in the titular role in Ophelia, a reimagining of the Hamlet tale, alongside Naomi Watts and Clive Owen. The project was filmed from April to July 2017 and debuted at the 2018 Sundance Film Festival. In February 2018, Ridley voiced the role of Cottontail in Peter Rabbit, an adaptation of the children's stories of the same name by Beatrix Potter.

In December 2019, Ridley appeared as Rey in Star Wars: The Rise of Skywalker, the last film in the sequel trilogy. She is not expected to reprise her role again after this film, and is quoted as saying, "I don't think anything could top [The Rise of Skywalker] for this character." However, she does show interest in returning as the character if needed, saying "[...] never say never. I’m always open to a revisit. But also the beautiful thing is it’s this wonderful, huge universe with all of these stories that have yet to be told. I think there’s a lot of cool things to be made before any potential revisit." She also saw some truth in her co-star Boyega's claim that she would feel jealous if subsequent films were made with somebody else playing Rey.

In 2021, Ridley co-starred in the film Chaos Walking, an adaption of the young-adult novel by Patrick Ness. She played Viola Eade, opposite Tom Holland who played Todd Hewitt. The film was released on March 5, 2021. The film had been delayed occasionally due to poor test screenings that followed the film's reshoots, and later due to the COVID-19 pandemic. It received negative reviews and was a box-office flop.
	
She lent her voice to the point-and-click mystery video game Twelve Minutes, alongside James McAvoy and Willem Dafoe. The game received positive reviews, with Ridley's performance being praised by critics. She also made a surprise appearance in Judd Apatow's 2022 movie, The Bubble, as Kate, a horny AI. The film received negative reviews.

Upcoming projects 
Ridley started filming the lead role in The Marsh King's Daughter in Ontario, Canada on 7 June 2021. Filming wrapped on 6 August 2021. She has signed on for a sci-fi mystery thriller film called Mind Fall with Mathieu Kassovitz attached to direct, and is currently shooting a biopic for Disney+ titled Young Woman and the Sea in the role of Gertrude Ederle. In 2021-22, she shot an indie film titled Sometimes I Think About Dying in Astoria, Oregon, with Rachel Lambert directing and Ridley additionally serving as a first-time main producer on the project. She will voice a character in the French stop motion animated film The Inventor, set for release in 2023.

In May 2022, it was announced that Ridley would star in Magpie, a contemporary noir thriller written by her partner Tom Bateman, based on Ridley's original story idea, which is set to be directed by Sam Yates. Ridley, Bateman and Kate Solomon of 55 Films act as producers for Magpie and describe the film as a "Hitchcockian thriller that will take audiences on a genuine ride". Filming began in London in January 2023.

Personal life
Ridley resides in Primrose Hill, London. Since 2017, she has been in a relationship with actor Tom Bateman, whom she met on the set of Murder on the Orient Express. In January 2023, during the Sundance Film Festival, Ridley confirmed that she and Bateman had married.

In 2016, Ridley revealed she had been diagnosed with endometriosis and polycystic ovary syndrome at age fifteen, requiring her to undergo multiple laparoscopic surgery procedures. She states that her condition left her feeling low in self-confidence due to acne which followed.

Social media presence
Following the 2016 Teen Choice Awards, which paid tribute to victims of gun violence, Ridley posted on both Instagram and Facebook an anti-gun violence message. Her post prompted backlash from the public, with critics accusing Ridley of hypocrisy in reference to the violence depicted in her Star Wars films. Because of this, she deleted her social media accounts, but briefly returned to Instagram, claiming the reason for the deletion was because she had "a busy few months ahead [and] so wanted less distractions". She reiterated this statement in 2017, saying that social media is "highly unhealthy for people's mental health," including hers. Ridley further commented on the topic in a 2019 interview, vowing never to return to social media. She said:

On 4 April 2022, Ridley returned to Instagram again after six years of being off the platform. In her first post, she is seen sipping tea and engaging in self-care "refreshed, recharged, and ready for what I'm calling my 'Year of Yes'". Ridley was welcomed back to Instagram by her Orient Express co-star Leslie Odom Jr. and Chewbacca actor Joonas Suotamo.

Filmography

Film

Television

Theatre

Music videos

Video games

Theme park attractions

Awards and nominations

References

External links

 

1992 births
Living people
21st-century English actresses
Actresses from London
Alumni of Birkbeck, University of London
Articles containing video clips
English film actresses
English television actresses
English video game actresses
English voice actresses
People from Maida Vale
People from Westminster